Encyclopedia of Modern Ukraine, abbreviated EMU, is a multi-volume national encyclopedia of Ukraine. It is an academic project of the Institute of Encyclopaedic Research of the National Academy of Sciences of Ukraine. Today, the reference work is available in a print edition and online.

The EMU provides an integral image of modern Ukraine describing events, institutions, organizations, activities, notions and people from the early 20th century to the present. It embraces all spheres of life in Ukraine, and reflects current views on historical events and personalities.

Paper edition

A first edition has been in progress. 30 volumes are planned — by 2022 24 volumes had been published and it has already become the most comprehensive paper encyclopedia on Ukraine to date.

Published volumes are co-edited by Ivan Dziuba, Arkadii Zhukovskyi, Oleh Romaniv, Mykola Zhelezniak; assisted by over 20 famous Ukrainian scientists including Borys Paton; written by over 1000 contributing experts, and compiled by editorial staff (10 professionals).

The EMU has repeatedly held leading places in the ‘Book of the Year’ Ukrainian national rating, it was awarded numerous diplomas, in particular, in 2003 it became a laureate of the “Person of the Year-2002” Ukrainian national program in the category “Cultural Project of the Year ”.

Previously it was planned the EMU will form the basis for the national multi-volume  Ukrainian Universal Encyclopaedia, a common project of the National Academy of Sciences of Ukraine and the Shevchenko Scientific Society.

Online encyclopedia

The EMU debuted online to the public in October 2014 and still continues to be as a work in progress (list of articles is incomplete). All content on the online Encyclopedia is available free. It is now among the popular Ukrainian published sites, with about 100 thousand unique visitors per month, and over 1 million per year). Articles on encyclopedia's website are organized by some themes: universe and earth, people, community, science and humanities, culture. The online format of the project lends itself to developing timely and relevant content for all users. Users have come from every continent, but the vast majority are naturally from Ukraine.

See also
 Encyclopedia of Ukraine
 Ukraine. A Concise Encyclopedia
 Ukrainian Soviet Encyclopedia

References

External links 
 Encyclopedia of Modern Ukraine 
 Institute of Encyclopaedic Research
 Матеріали Робочої групи з підготовки проекту концепції створення Української Універсальної Енциклопедії

Ukrainian encyclopedias
Ukrainian studies
Ukrainian-language encyclopedias
21st-century encyclopedias
Ukrainian-language books
National encyclopedias

Ukrainian online encyclopedias